Bankstown Senior College, previously known as Bankstown Boys High School, is a coeducational senior college located in the suburb of Bankstown, in the City of Canterbury-Bankstown, New South Wales, Australia.

History
During the 1950s the Department of Education bought land in Antwerp Street from a company called Bankstown Pipe Works. The land was formerly a brick pit.
From 1963 to 1964, the school operated as Bankstown Junior Boys High school and was located at Central Bankstown on Restwell Street in 'portable' accommodation. It shared a playground with Bankstown Boys Primary.
From 1965 to 1990, the school was known as Bankstown Boys High School. It was located on part of the old pit site at the Eldridge Road end of Antwerp Street, in a purpose built school, opposite Bankstown Hospital (now called Bankstown Lidcombe Hospital).
From 1990 to 1991, there was a brief transitional period where the school went  by the name of Bankstown Community High School.
The school's current status as a co-educational senior college has been in place since 1991 to this present day.

Notable students
Nick Gabor - Economist
Alex Karamanos - Materials Testing Scientist
Leslie Knight - Graphic Artist
Pastor Ray Lind
Vince Sorrenti - Comedian and Architect
The Reverend Gregory Webster
Professor Robert Whittaker AM FRSN DConstM(Honoris Causa) - Academic, Chartered and Licensed Builder

See also 

 List of government schools in New South Wales
 Bankstown Girls High School
 Education in Australia

References

Bankstown, New South Wales
Public high schools in Sydney
1963 establishments in Australia
Educational institutions established in 1963